Daniel is a masculine given name and a surname of Hebrew origin.  It means "God is my judge" (cf. Gabriel—"God is my strength"), and derives from two early biblical figures, primary among them Daniel from the Book of Daniel. It is a common given name for males, and is also used as a surname. It is also the basis for various derived given names and surnames.

Background 
The name evolved into over 100 different spellings in countries around the world. Nicknames (Dan, Danny) are common in both English and Hebrew; "Dan" may also be a complete given name rather than a nickname. The  name "Daniil" (Даниил) is common in Russia.  Feminine versions (Danielle, Danièle, Daniela, Daniella, Dani, Danitza) are prevalent as well. It has been particularly well-used in Ireland. The Dutch names "Daan" and "Daniël" are also variations of Daniel. A related surname developed as a patronymic, Daniels. Other surnames derived from "Daniel" include McDaniel and Danielson.

Popularity
In the United States, the U.S. Social Security Administration reports that Daniel has peaked as the fifth most popular name for newborns in 1985, 1990, 2007, and 2008. The U.S. Census Bureau reported that in the 2000 census, "Daniels" was the 182nd most common surname in the U.S., while "McDaniel" was ranked at 323, and "Daniel" (without a final "s") was ranked at 380. In 2016, Top 100 Baby Names in Canada ranked it at number 27.

People named Daniel 
List of people named Daniel
List of people surnamed Daniel

See also
Danel

References 

Theophoric names
Hebrew-language names
English-language masculine given names
English masculine given names
French masculine given names
Romanian masculine given names
Bulgarian masculine given names
Jewish given names
Czech masculine given names
Danish masculine given names
Swedish masculine given names
German masculine given names
Slovene masculine given names
Slovak masculine given names
Polish masculine given names
Norwegian masculine given names
Spanish masculine given names
Portuguese masculine given names
Russian masculine given names
Scandinavian masculine given names
Modern names of Hebrew origin